Gone Is Love  is a studio album released by Paul Mauriat and his Orchestra in 1970 on Philips LP record 600345.  The title track was released as a single (Philips) 40683 which charted on the Easy Listening top-40.

Reception
Billboard reviewed the album as having "distinctive arrangements and voicings", and being "intelligent easy listening".  The album entered the Billboard Top LPs chart on September 19, 1970, and remained on the chart for three weeks, peaking at position No. 184.

Track listing

References

1970 albums
Paul Mauriat albums
Philips Records albums
Instrumental albums